Abrodiella is a genus of beetles in the family Carabidae, containing the following species:

 Abrodiella amoenula (Boheman, 1848)
 Abrodiella pittoresca (Liebke, 1938)

References

Lebiinae
Carabidae genera